Florida is a town and municipality located in the Department of Valle del Cauca, Colombia.

Its first inhabitants were indigenous peoples, mestizos, afro-Latinos and mulattos. Local rivers are the Fraile, Parraga, and Desbaratado. The main road is la Calle Novena ("Ninth Street"). 

La Hoya, a pool of water formed by a section of the Fraile River, attracts tourists.

In 2008 FARC requested this municipality together with Pradera as free areas for them to negotiate to exchange 44 hostages they held for guerilla fighters imprisoned by the Colombian government.

Notable people 
 Jherson Vergara, footballer
 Róbinson Zapata, football player
Juan Camilo Angulo, Football player

References 

Municipalities of Valle del Cauca Department
Geography of Colombia